Anzhelika Vitaliivna Savchenko (born 11 August 1982) is a Ukrainian theatre and film actress, and an artist of the Ivan Franko National Academic Drama Theater. She is a Merited and People's Artist of Ukraine.

Biography 
Savchenko was born in Dnipropetrovsk on 11 August 1982. In 1998, she enrolled in the Dnipropetrovsk State College of Theatre and Arts.

She played her first role as a second-year student in the Tennessee Williams play Sweet Bird of Youth, directed by Vadym Pinsky, playing the part of Helena on stage at the Gorky Theatre of Russian Drama and Comedy.

After graduating in 2002, she joined the Ivan Franko National Academic Drama Theatre, where she works to this day.

Roles

Ivan Franko National Academic Drama Theatre 
 Ladies and Hussars by Aleksander Fredro; dir. Yuri Odynoky as Miss Zosya
 Edith Piaf. Life on credit by Yu. Rybchinskyi and V. Vasalatiy; dir. Ihor Afanasyev - Simona
 Eric XIV by August Strindberg; dir. S. Moiseyev - Karin Monsdotter
 Living Corpse by Leo Tolstoy; dir. R. Marcholia - Sasha
 A wife is a wife by Anton Chekhov; dir. Valentyn Kozmenko-Delinde — Chorister, Maid
 Marriage by Nikolai Gogol; dir. Valentin Kozmenko-Delinde - Orina Panteleimonivna, aunt
 Cinderella Sh. Perot; dir. K. Chepura - Cinderella
 Richard III (2016) based on the play by William Shakespeare; dir. Avtandil Varsimashvili[ru] - Queen Elizaveta
 Three Comrades by Erich Maria Remarque; dir. Yuri Odynoky — Patricia Holman
 The Seagull by Anton Chekhov; dir. Valentin Kozmenko-Delinde — Nina Mykhailivna Zarechna
 The Tempest by William Shakespeare; dir. S. Maslobojshchikov - Miranda, Prospero's daughter
 Romances, Nostalgia O. Bilozuba - Flower girl
 Urus-Shaitan by I. Afanasyev - Galya
 Hysteria by Terry Johnson; dir. G. Gladiy is Jessica's mother
 Dream Hunters by M. Pavych - Princess Ateh
 The Brothers Karamazov by Fyodor Dostoevsky; dir. Yury Odynoky - Yulia
 Solo-miya O. Bilozuba - Woman
 Bremen Musicians H. Gladkov, Y. Entina - Princess
 Romeo and Juliet by William Shakespeare; dir. Valentin Kozmenko-Delinde - Juliet
 The one who fell from the sky I. Poklad, O. Vrataryova - Kylyna
 Stolen happiness by Ivan Franko; dir. Sergey Danchenko - Girl
 Kotygoroshko by Alexander Navrotsky — Olenka
 How not to love you, my Kiev; dir. Oleksandr Bilozub - Singer
 The Kaidash Family by Ivan Nechuy-Levytsky, directed by Petro Ilchenko - Melashka
 The broken jar by Heinrich von Kleist; dir. R. Marholia - Eva
 The Idiot (2018) by Fyodor Dostoyevsky; dir. Yuri Odinoky — Anastasia Pylypivna Barashkova
 Verba (2019) based on the extravaganza drama "Forest Song" by Lesya Ukrainka; dir. Serhii Masloboyshchikov - Kylina, mother
 Cyrano de Bergerac (2020) based on the play by Edmond Rostand, dir. Yuri Odinoky — Roxana
 Peer Gynt (2021) based on the play by Henrik Ibsen; dir. Ivan Uryvsky — Solveig

Filmography 
 2012 - Guitar lessons (miniseries) - Sveta
 2012 - Anna German. Mystery of the White Angel (series)
 2013 - Zhenskiy doctor 2 (series) - Vera Akimova
 2013 - Bird in a Cage (miniseries)
 2013 - The Bomb (series) - journalist
 2019 - Only a miracle - Maria, Nika's wife, Anika and Severyn's mother

References 

1982 births
Ukrainian actresses
Living people
People from Dnipro